Lubowo may refer to the following places:
Lubowo, Greater Poland Voivodeship (west-central Poland)
Łubowo, Greater Poland Voivodeship
Lubowo, Koszalin County in West Pomeranian Voivodeship (north-west Poland)
Lubowo, Stargard County in West Pomeranian Voivodeship
Lubowo, Wałcz County in West Pomeranian Voivodeship
Łubowo, West Pomeranian Voivodeship